Arab Shipbuilding and Repair Yard Company (ASRY), is a Multinational Arab company based in Al Hidd, Bahrain. The company was founded in 1977, by seven OAPEC member countries: Bahrain, Kuwait, United Arab Emirates, Iraq, Qatar, Saudi Arabia and Libya.

The company offers shipbuilding and vessel repair services and manufactures towing tugs, work and crew boats, and offshore service vessels. The company's repair services include crank shaft replacement, new crank shaft insertion, crane barge to pipe laying vessel conversion, pipe laying barge conversion, propeller repair, steel machining, pipe fabrication, painting and hydro blasting, and electrical, electronic, and instrumentation repairs and installations.

References

External links 
 
 ASRY on OAPEC website

Shipbuilding companies of the United Arab Emirates